Antônio Firmino Monteiro (22 February 1855 – 3 July 1888) was an Afro-Brazilian painter.

Biography 
He was born into poverty in Rio de Janeiro, and in his youth had to work as a clerk, printer and bookbinder to help support his family. As a result, he had to postpone his artistic studies at the Academia Imperial de Belas Artes until he was older than the average new student. He eventually was able to study with Victor Meirelles, Agostinho José da Mota and João Zeferino da Costa.

Most of his work consisted of landscapes and genre scenes done in and around Rio de Janeiro. One of his first trips elsewhere occurred in 1880, when he was able to go to Europe with the financial assistance of Emperor Pedro II. When he returned, he applied for the chair of "Landscape, Flower and Animal Painting" at the academy, but the position went to someone else.

He participated in the "Exposição Gerais de Belas Artes" several times. In 1879, he received the Second Gold Medal. In 1884, he was named a Knight of the Imperial Ordem da Rosa for "Camões no seu leito de morte" (Camões on his deathbed) and works depicting the street life of the capital.

From 1885 to 1887, he made further study trips to Europe, with a longer stay in Paris. When he returned, he became a teacher at the Escola de Belas Artes da Bahia. He was also interested in the chemistry of pigments. His death, in 1888 in Niterói, is described as "sudden".

Gallery

References

Further reading 
 Quirino Campofiorito. História da pintura brasileira no século XIX. Rio de Janeiro: Pinakotheke, 1983.
 Gonzaga Duque. A Arte brasileira: pintura e esculptura. Rio de Janeiro: H. Lombaerts & C., 1888
 Laudelino Freire. Um século de pintura: apontamentos para a história da pintura no Brasil: de 1816-1916. Rio de Janeiro: Röhe, 1916.

External links

 Biography and appreciation of Monteiro @ Pitoresco

1855 births
1888 deaths
People from Rio de Janeiro (city)
19th-century Brazilian painters
19th-century Brazilian male artists